"Solid" is a song recorded by husband-and-wife songwriting duo Ashford & Simpson, released in September 1984 as the first single from their eleventh studio album, Solid (1984). It peaked at number one on the US Billboard soul chart, and #12 on the Billboard Hot 100 chart.

Background
The song was written by the duo and follows a similar template of most of their hits for other artists, except with a slight 1980s inflection to the music. In the lyrics, the narrators of the song celebrate the fact that, through all the difficulties and problems their relationship has faced, they made their love stronger by learning how to forgive and trust each other, and their love for one another remains "solid as a rock".

Music video
The accompanying music video for "Solid" is set on a rainy afternoon in a park. Valerie Simpson exits a taxi in a park on a cloudy day, and escapes from a sudden downpour underneath a bridge. As she sings the opening of the song a cappella, Nick Ashford arrives and joins in. As the video progresses, they are joined by others, including a cyclist in yellow spandex, a gang who just want to sing, and several bongo players, also trying to escape the downpour. It was shot in New York City in Central Park at the Willowdell Arch.

Personnel
Nickolas Ashford and Valerie Simpson – vocals
Sid McGinnis – guitar
Francisco Centeno – bass
Valerie Simpson – synthesizers
Ed Walsh – synthesizer programming
Chris Parker – drums
Jimmy Simpson – percussion
Vinny Della Rocca, Michael Brecker – saxophone
Joe Mosello – trumpet
Ashford & Simpson, Ray Simpson, Ullanda McCullough, Vivian Cherry – backing vocals
 Tim Cox - recording engineer

Charts

Weekly charts

Year-end charts

In other media
 The song was featured during the closing credits of the 208th episode of Santa Barbara from 20 May 1985.
 The song features in the UK sitcom Peep Show episode "Wedding" first shown in the UK in 2004. One of the main characters, Jez, marries Nancy in order for her to remain in the country. During the episode Jez is forced to dance his first dance alone as Nancy is called away for a job interview, that first song being "Solid".
 The song also featured in an episode of the sitcom Arrested Development, where it is ironically played at the opening ceremony of a new house, which is almost instantaneously knocked down.
In 2009, Ashford & Simpson remade the song in honor of President Barack Obama, calling it "Solid (As Barack)".
Featured in FRED: the Movie (2010) in one of Fred's daydreams.

References

External links

1984 singles
1984 songs
Ashford & Simpson songs
Number-one singles in New Zealand
Songs written by Nickolas Ashford
Songs written by Valerie Simpson
Capitol Records singles
Male–female vocal duets